Marina Romea is a village in the municipality of Ravenna, located on the coast north of the city, between Porto Corsini and Casal Borsetti. It is part of the constituency no. 4 "of the sea", based in Marina di Ravenna.

Municipalities of the Province of Ravenna